Collin Kenneth Snider (born October 10, 1995) is an American professional baseball pitcher for the Kansas City Royals of Major League Baseball (MLB). He made his MLB debut in 2022.

Amateur career
Snider played college baseball at Vanderbilt University. In 2016, he played collegiate summer baseball with the Yarmouth–Dennis Red Sox of the Cape Cod Baseball League.

Professional career
The Kansas City Royals selected Snider in the 12th round of the 2017 Major League Baseball Draft. Snider spent his debut season split between the rookie-level Burlington Royals and the Single-A Lexington Legends, pitching to a cumulative 3.21 ERA in 17 appearances. Snider returned to Lexington in 2018, posting a 5.57 ERA with 50 strikeouts in 76.0 innings of work across 29 games. In 2019, Snider split the year between the rookie-level AZL Royals and the High-A Wilmington Blue Rocks, recording a 2.24 ERA with 34 strikeouts in 31 games between the two teams.

Snider did not play in a game in 2020 due to the cancellation of the minor league season because of the COVID-19 pandemic. In 2021, Snider played for the Double-A Northwest Arkansas Naturals and the Triple-A Omaha Storm Chasers, registering a 4.48 ERA with 64 strikeouts in 66.1 innings pitched across 48 total appearances. The Royals added Snider to their 40-man roster after the season on November 19, 2021.

Snider made the Royals 2022 opening day roster to begin the 2022 season.

References

External links

1995 births
Living people
Baseball players from Nashville, Tennessee
Major League Baseball pitchers
Kansas City Royals players
Vanderbilt Commodores baseball players
Yarmouth–Dennis Red Sox players
Arizona League Royals players
Burlington Royals players
Lexington Legends players
Wilmington Blue Rocks players
Northwest Arkansas Naturals players
Omaha Storm Chasers players